Louisville is a town in Barbour County, Alabama, United States.  Originally named "Lewisville" and still pronounced as such.  At the 2020 census, the population was 395.

Geography

According to the U.S. Census Bureau, the town has a total area of 2.8 square miles (7.1 km), all land.

Demographics

2020 census

As of the 2020 United States census, there were 395 people, 238 households, and 141 families residing in the town.

2000 census
At the 2000 census there were 612 people, 242 households, and 168 families in the town. The racial makeup of the town was 52.94% White, 40.69% Black or African American, 0.65% Native American, 5.23% from other races, and 0.49% from two or more races. 6.37% of the population were Hispanic or Latino of any race.
Of the 242 households 26.9% had children under the age of 18 living with them, 52.5% were married couples living together, 14.0% had a female householder with no husband present, and 30.2% were non-families. 26.9% of households were one person and 16.5% were one person aged 65 or older. The average household size was 2.53 and the average family size was 3.05.

The age distribution was 23.7% under the age of 18, 10.6% from 18 to 24, 23.2% from 25 to 44, 22.1% from 45 to 64, and 20.4% 65 or older. The median age was 39 years. For every 100 females, there were 87.7 males. For every 100 females age 18 and over, there were 85.3 males.

The median household income was $20,859 and the median family income  was $27,014. Males had a median income of $27,500 versus $24,583 for females. The per capita income for the town was $13,151. About 22.4% of families and 28.0% of the population were below the poverty line, including 22.0% of those under age 18 and 34.8% of those age 65 or over.

Notable people
George M. Grant, former U.S. Representative
Jeremiah Norman Williams, U.S. Representative from Alabama's 2nd congressional district from 1875 to 1877

Gallery

References

Towns in Alabama
Towns in Barbour County, Alabama